Ade Abayomi Olufeko (born 1980), is an American-born designer, technologist, and entrepreneur primarily active in Lagos. His international work in humanities has been leveraged by Consortiums, NGOs, and high-impact leaders.  He is the founder of Visual Collaborative, an American festival, and publishing platform that partners with artists, scientists, lawyers, and innovators on socio-economics. In 2003, he became a recipient of the IBM Gerstner Award for exceptional service during a malware epidemic.

Olufeko's long-standing involvement in technology, exhibitions, keynotes and lectures at institutions such as the University Of Oxford, Yale University, Harvard Business School and Columbia University, has been covered by various media, such as Leadership news and Voice of America.

Early life and education 
Ade Olufeko was born in the Upper Midwest city of Minneapolis. He is of Ijebu heritage. His late father, Abayomi Sr. was an accountant, His mother, Olubola, a businesswoman and educator in fashion and textiles.  He returned to Lagos with his parents in childhood, growing up in the mainland city of Surulere, during Nigeria's Second Republic receiving his primary education at Unilag staff school and later St. Gregory's College in Obalende for his secondary education. In the mid-1990s, he returned to Minneapolis for further studies at Henry High where on occasion he was invited to share experiences with his IB peers on subjects of culture shock, and for a period was a resident of the historic Stevens Square. He is an alumnus of Metropolitan State University, where he studied computer science and multimedia.

Career

Work as technologist, IBM and Visual Collaborative
Olufeko began his technology career in youth during the dot-com era, working in motion graphics, the internet and hardware for companies such as Ameritech and 3M spinoff Imation. His focus developed into digital strategy and information architecture, consulting for companies in media, technology, health and finance industries such as Atlantic Records, PayPal, Adobe Systems, Bank of America and Shavlik Technologies; to American celebrities such as Amel Larrieux and other high-profile personalities.  He assumed the role of web manager at SICO America, an international furniture and hospitality company. He collaborated with architects and assembly personnel in North America, Europe, Asia, Japan, and South Pacific regions for a year before parting ways to realign his career with emerging Web 2.0 technologies. During the convergence of his work, whilst developing professional connections on the east coast, he relocated to New York City, working for media conglomerate Warner Music Group. In 2007, Olufeko founded Visual Collaborative, a seasonal traveling exhibition. The U.S initiated platform draws on the tenets of socioeconomics and intersects Olufeko's vocational interests in diverse media, creativity and technology. Since the launch of the platform, he has collaborated in numerous cities with over 150 artists. In 2015, he returned to serve as the curator of the platform, further showcasing the work of diverse artists and multidisciplinary creatives. In the year 2016 he suspended activities with Visual Collaborative for a few years, to work as a management consultant for IBM's Interactive Experience service line.

In the British spring season of 2018, London Business School held its annual business summit, centered around scaling enterprises on the African continent. The institution collaborated with Olufeko, taking place at the Landmark. He moderated the socio-cultural panel, which featured fashion designer Ozwald Boateng OBE, media personality Banky W., the manager of the late Fela Anikulapo Kuti; Rikki Stein, also joined by an executive of Sony Music West Africa, Michael Ugwu.

Interdisciplinary impact, Keynote lectures and panels

Olufeko's lectures engage technology with contemporary issues such as governance, ethics, innovation and culture. In 2019, Olufeko delivered the opening keynote at the Africana conference for African Peace and Development at Yale University, where he also served as a panelist imparting on topics of Innovation and Development in Africa. In April of the same year, he moderated a panel at Columbia University on the business of art and literature.  In 2018, he accepted an invitation from Georgetown University and gave a series of talks and a fireside chat on the relationship of the African value chain and cognitive design.

From 2011–2017, Olufeko gave lectures speaking at; Oxford University, Harvard Business School, Carnegie Mellon and Lagos Business School. In 2017, Olufeko spoke at TEDxIkeja on Visual Metaphors and its collaborations. He has also appeared on TVC news and Voice Of America, the latter described Olufeko as an expert who advances the cause of humanities in the creative economy. According to Business Day, his presentations have been on innovation, multidisciplinary design and collaborations. In 2016, he was invited to join other thought leaders at Covenant University discussing technology and governance in Nigeria.

Advisory work in Nigeria
 During the Great Recession, Olufeko started on many visits to and around Nigeria reacquainting with the region. Embracing economics of the sub-Sahara's emerging market, he engaged as an independent consultant advising with the branding effort of various indigenous businesses, getting them on the Web. In November 2018, Olufeko was invited to speak at the Nigerian Diaspora Investment Summit.

In 2017, his observations of the Nigerian technology ecosystem were described by Incubate Africa as an "eye-opener". The same year, Olufeko's interview on prominent Victoria Island radio station Smooth 98.1 FM, "demystified unaddressed African complexes in social interactions". For his fieldwork in humanities, he was invited as a keynote to speak at World Economic Forum initiative; Global Shapers, discussing disruptive Innovation. In the same year, Vanguard News highlighted Olufeko's business advisory activities in the creative ecosystem, citing his advocacy of African women entrepreneurs, in connection with IWD. 
In 2017, his research in design, led to a journey inside Sungbo's Eredo, bringing its story back into social dialogue.
His keynote lecture at the March 2018 WordPress conference in Lagos, covered digital cohesion, societal value of interoperable systems and Big data in West Africa.  On August 18, 2018, Olufeko delivered a talk on Design thinking and the intersection of art and design, to a sold-out audience during a TEDxLagos event at the Muson Centre. In 2020, he assumed the role of chairperson for the Creative Sector group at the Lagos Chamber of Commerce and Industry. Supporting the advancement of education, Olufeko served on the global advisory council for the Steering for Greatness Foundation from 2019-2021

Art

Cognitive style
Self-taught as a digital painter and in mixed-media artistry, Olufeko's creative process as an avocation evolved over a decade. Inspired by the convergence of design and technology, 3D geometry, fractals and embedded data are consistent elements in his exhibited work. It explores Africanfuturism, experimental Chaos theory and Counterculture. He is a former member of the Society for Neuroscience.

In 2021, Olufeko created and introduced the wax print version of the indigenous AYO mancala in Ankara to enter the consumer market with 200 units. The response and reviews were well-covered in local media. In the third quarter of the year, he released the Kente and Adire product lines which drew considerable interest outside Nigeria across west Africa and its diaspora. According to audited data, the sales of the locally made units reached over 2000 in sales. During the capital flight in the nation and following a fire outbreak in one of the largest wood communities, part of the sales helped feed numerous artisans and their families.

Influences and public resonance
In various interviews, Olufeko credited the social cohesion of Surulere, and places like the National Arts Theatre as leaving lasting impressions during his childhood. According to The Punch his influences have ranged diversely from Luis Barragan for architecture, Hillman Curtis for new media design, and Yugo Nakamura for pioneering interactive and motion graphic work.

Olufeko credits his mother an educator and illustrator in fashion and textiles, for her collaborative and business influence, she ran a fashion institute in Surulere during the 1980s and 1990s. Feminine or yin related subjects have appeared in his abstract art pieces, aligning to his advocacy of women and his respect to many matriarchy figures. This subsequently led to several internationally recognized NGOs on Female genital mutilation (FGM) and human trafficking to leverage his artwork.

Selected exhibitions
 2008: Undercurrent Arts, Wynwood Art District, (Miami, FL) 
 2011: Queens Gambit,  Dual popups in Forest Hills and Fresh Meadows, (New York, NY)
 2013: United for Kids Foundation. Whittemore House (Washington D.C.)
 2013: United for Kids Foundation, Passion Ball, Civic Center, (Lagos, Nigeria)
 2013: Brave is Beautiful. Hudson Terrace (New York, NY) 
 2014: 16th African Business Conference. Harvard Business School (Boston, MA)

Literary works 
Olufeko served as the guest editor-in-chief for the Polaris open-access e-journal. In 2019, he designed the publication's style guide to conduct over 100 interviews. The catalog explores creative disciplines, social perspectives, and intrinsic value of the featured practitioners and how they interact with society.  This collective is said to have been designed to iterate over time as a value-add service model for content providers, academic institutions, and incubators.  In the latter part of the collective, Olufeko released interview content with American author of The Laws of Human Nature, Robert Greene, and others of influence.

 Polaris (Collective's first issue, April 2019) 
 Voyager, Volume 2 (June 2019) 
 Vivencias, Volume 3 (September 2019) 
 Supernova, Volume 4 (December 2019) 
 TwentyEightyFour, Volume 5 (May 2020) 
 Grand Masters, Volume 7 (August 2020)
 Eta Carinae, Volume 10 (December 2020)

Awards and recognition
In 2003, Olufeko received the IBM Gerstner award in Global Business Services.
NABF (Nigerian American Business Forum) Young entrepreneur achievement Award 2018.
In 2019, Olufeko received an award of special recognition serving a judge for the Prof. Ayodele Awojobi design and engineering competition.

Notes

References 

1980 births
Living people
Artists from Lagos
American people of Yoruba descent
American people of Nigerian descent
American emigrants to Nigeria
St Gregory's College, Lagos alumni
Mixed-media artists
IBM employees
Digital artists
People from Minneapolis
Metropolitan State University alumni
Yoruba artists
Yoruba businesspeople
People from Ijebu Ode
Nigerian company founders
21st-century Nigerian businesspeople
21st-century American businesspeople
Businesspeople from Lagos
21st-century Nigerian artists
21st-century American artists
Nigerian technology businesspeople
American technology businesspeople